Glenn Frey Live is a live album by Glenn Frey, released in 1993. In 2018, Universal Music released a four disc pack entitled ’Above The Clouds’, in honor of Glenn Frey after his death in 2016 which features fully remastered video of the concert featured on this album (including omitted songs).

Track listing
"Peaceful Easy Feeling" (Jack Tempchin) – 2:35
"New Kid in Town" (Frey, Don Henley, J.D. Souther) – 6:08
"The One You Love" (Frey, Tempchin) – 5:15
"Wild Mountain Thyme" (Francis McPeake) – 4:31
"Strange Weather" (Frey, Oliver, Tempchin) – 5:04
"I've Got Mine" (Frey, Tempchin) – 5:57
"Lyin' Eyes/Take It Easy" [medley] (Frey, Henley, Jackson Browne) – 5:55
"River of Dreams" (Frey, Tempchin) – 4:57
"True Love" (Frey, Tempchin) – 5:24
"Love in the 21st Century" (Frey, Danny Kortchmar, Tempchin) – 6:09
"Smuggler's Blues" (Frey, Tempchin) – 3:50
"The Heat Is On" (Harold Faltermeyer, Keith Forsey) – 4:30
"Heartache Tonight" (Frey, Henley, Bob Seger, Souther) – 6:03
"Desperado" (Henley, Frey) – 4:03

Omitted songs
MCA video released the entire concert on video as "Glenn Frey: Strange Weather Live", in 1992. Because there wasn't enough room on the Live CD, the concert includes three songs (all from Frey's solo career) that the CD left out. The concert opens with the Strange Weather album track "Long Hot Summer", the 1988 single "Livin' Right" appears halfway through, and 1982's "Partytown" is part of the encore.

Personnel 
 Glenn Frey – lead vocals, guitar
 Jay Oliver – keyboards, backing vocals 
 Barry Sarna – keyboards, backing vocals
 Danny Grenier – guitar, backing vocals
 Duane Sciacqua – guitar, backing vocals
 Bryan Garofalo – bass, backing vocals
 Martin Fera – drums
 Chris Mostert – percussion, saxophone
 Michito Sanchez – percussion
 Al Garth – saxophone, violin
 Greg "Frosty" Smith – baritone saxophone
 Darrell Leonard – trumpet

Production 
 Glenn Frey – producer, liner notes 
 Elliot Scheiner – producer, engineer, mixing 
 Mad Dog Ranch (Showmass, Colorado) – mixing location 
 Yutaka Nishimura – photography 
 Peacock Marketing & Design – design

References

Glenn Frey albums
1993 live albums
MCA Records live albums